Cranshaw is a surname. Notable people with the surname include:

Bob Cranshaw (1932–2016), American jazz bassist
Patrick Cranshaw (1919–2005), American character actor

See also
Cranshaws, village in Scotland
Crashaw
Crenshaw (surname)